Prithviraj Chavan (born 17 March 1946) is an Indian politician who was the 17th Chief Minister of Maharashtra, a state in Western India. Chavan is a graduate of the Birla Institute of Technology and Science, Pilani and University of California, Berkeley in mechanical engineering. He spent time working in the field of aircraft instrumentation and designing audio recorders for anti-submarine warfare in the US before returning to India and becoming an entrepreneur in 1974. Referred to in the media as a technocrat with a clean, non-controversial image, a low-profile leader. Chavan served as the Minister of State in the Prime Minister's Office in the Ministry of Parliamentary Affairs and Ministry of Personnel, Public Grievances, and Pensions. Chavan was also General Secretary of the All-India Congress Committee (AICC), in-charge of many states, including Jammu and Kashmir, Karnataka, Haryana, Gujarat, Tripura, and Arunachal Pradesh.

Chavan was drawn into politics after meeting with Rajiv Gandhi. He has been involved in the Indian National Congress bureaucracy for most of his adult life, notably as a member of the Rajya Sabha (the upper house of the India's Parliament) and later architect of the civil nuclear liability bill. He was first elected to the Lok Sabha in 1991 and followed it up in subsequent elections. Chavan held five portfolios in the United Progressive Alliance (UPA) government that includes the ministry of science and technology. He became chief minister of Maharashtra in 2010 at the insistence of Congress President Sonia Gandhi succeeding unrelated Ashok Chavan. He resigned as the chief minister of Maharashtra after the ruling NCP-Congress alliance split in the state.

Early life
Chavan was born in Indore, Central Provinces on 17 March 1946. His parents were Dajisaheb Chavan and Premala. He is the eldest of three siblings. His younger sisters are Nirupama Ajitrao Yadav-Deshmukh and Vidyulata Venkatrao Ghorpade. Dajisaheb was a member of the Lok Sabha from the Karad constituency from 1957 to 1973 & served as a Minister in the cabinets of Prime Ministers Jawaharlal Nehru, Lal Bahadur Shastri and Indira Gandhi. Upon Dajisaheb's death in 1973, Chavan's mother, Premala (affectionately known as Premalakaki, aunt Premala) contested from her late husband's constituency and was elected in the by election in 1973 and in the general elections of 1977, 1984, and 1989 serving till her death in 1991.

Chavan began his schooling at a local Municipal Marathi-medium school in Karad. After his father moved to Delhi, Chavan joined Nutan Marathi School  in Delhi. Chavan graduated in Mechanical Engineering from the Birla Institute of Technology and Science, Pilani. After graduation in 1967, he won a UNESCO scholarship in Germany and later moved to pursue a Master of Science degree from the University of California, Berkeley. He wrote articles on computer science; engineering design; and also contributed to research in computerization. He also worked briefly in the US as a design engineer, working on defence electronics, anti-submarine warfare, computer storage systems, and computerisation of Indian languages.

Political career

Chavan started his political career in 1991 by winning his parents old seat of Karad to the Lok sabha. He went on to win the seat thrice, in 1991, 1996 and 1998 but lost in 1999.

He served as a Minister of State for the ministries of Ministry of Science and Technology, Ministry of Earth Sciences, Ministry of Personnel, Public Grievances and Pensions, Ministry of Parliamentary Affairs and in charge of Prime Minister's Office. Earlier he also served as the Minister of State in charge of the Department of Atomic Energy. Chavan replaced Ashok Chavan as chief minister after the latter's involvement in the Adarsh Housing Society scam forced him to resign. Reasons for his choice reported by the media included the perception that he had a "clean image" and that he did not have his own faction of political supporters within the state.

One of his first actions as Chief Minister was to play a role along with Civil Aviation minister Praful Patel, in convincing Jairam Ramesh, the Minister for Environment And Forests in obtaining environmental clearance for the planned second airport in Mumbai, Navi Mumbai International Airport.

Personal life
Chavan married Satvasheela on 16 December 1976. They have a daughter, Ankita and a son named Jai. Ankita married on 29 November 2013 in Delhi.

Posts held
 1991-92 Member, Consultative Committee for the Ministry of Science and Technology.
 1992-93 Member, Committee on Science and Technology, Ministry of Environment and Forests.
 1994-96 Member, Standing Committee on Finance and Planning.
 1996-99 Member, Committee on Provision of Computers to Members of Parliament.
 2000-01 Spokesperson, All India Congress Committee.
 2002-04 Member, Consultative Committee for the Ministry of Defence.
 2004-22 May 2009 and 28 May 2009 onward Minister of State in the Prime Minister's Office.
 11 Nov 2010 - 25 Sept 2014 - Chief Minister of Maharashtra
 19 Oct 2014 - Member of Legislative Assembly (MLA) in Maharashtra

References

External links

 Official Website
 Article on Rediff
 Prithviraj Chavan named new Maharashtra CM
 Prithviraj Chavan - India Today Profile

1946 births
Living people
Union ministers of state of India
Rajya Sabha members from Maharashtra
Marathi politicians
India MPs 1991–1996
India MPs 1996–1997
Chief Ministers of Maharashtra
UC Berkeley College of Engineering alumni
India MPs 1998–1999
Indian National Congress politicians from Maharashtra
Politicians from Indore
People from Karad
Maharashtra MLAs 2014–2019
Chief ministers from Indian National Congress